Templetonia retusa, known as cockies tongues, cocky's tongues, or coral bush is a shrub in the family Fabaceae (Leguminosae) that grows in southern and south-western Australia. It is found in coastal woodland and heaths over limestone from Shark Bay, Western Australia, to near Kangaroo Island, as well as inland in the Flinders Ranges of South Australia.

References 

Brongniartieae
Fabales of Australia
Plants described in 1803
Flora of South Australia
Flora of Western Australia